Ernest Peake (born 1888) was a Welsh footballer who played as a defender for Liverpool in the English Football League. Peake was a Welsh international who played for Aberystwyth Town F.C. (when he was 15 years of age) in mid-field before he signed for Liverpool in 1909. He only appeared sporadically until the 1912–13 season when he played 26 matches. He was unable to command a regular place in the team and he left for Scottish team Third Lanark A.C. in 1914. After finishing his playing career, he moved to Aberdare in Wales where he had a position as player/manager of Aberamman. As footballers were not on the same wage as they are today and he had two sons (another died in infancy due to an accident) and a wife to support so he had to work in a colliery called Brown’s pit which was in Aberdare. He worked on the surface so he was a collier where he remained until his death due to ill-health unrelated to the colliery in November 1931.

His brother, Robert, was a Welsh amateur international and played for Cardiff City and Rochdale.

References

1888 births
Welsh footballers
Liverpool F.C. players
Third Lanark A.C. players
English Football League players
Year of death missing
Association football defenders
Wales international footballers
Scottish Football League players
Aberystwyth Town F.C. players